Jaanai Derece Gordon (born 7 December 1995) is an English professional footballer who plays for Banbury United, on loan from National League North side Boston United. He plays as a forward.

Club career

Peterborough United
Born in Northampton, England, Gordon began his career with Peterborough United in 2009 and appeared twice as an unused substitute in the 2011–12 season, having been a first team regular in the youth and development squads. Gordon then signed his first professional contract,  in December 2012 on his 17th birthday. By that time he had already made his first team debut, in a 2–0 home defeat by Wolverhampton Wanderers on 22 September 2012. In November 2013, having made four league appearances for Peterborough, Gordon went on trial with Premier League side West Ham United scoring twice in his opening trial game for West Ham under-18 side against Aston Villa under-18s and another two in a 9–0 defeat of Gillingham in a friendly on 11 November 2013. In November 2013, a West Ham United bid for Gordon was rejected by Peterborough United.

West Ham United

On 31 December 2013, West Ham United confirmed the signing of Gordon. In January 2014, Gordon was an unused substitute for West Ham's 5–0 FA Cup defeat by Nottingham Forest.

Loan spells
Gordon joined Chelmsford City on loan for a month on 22 December 2014. Several days later, he scored on his debut, in 5–1 home defeat by Ebbsfleet United. Gordon then scored in his next game, a 5–3 away win against Staines Town, followed up by scoring his third goal, a 2–0 away win against Ebbsfleet United and in his fourth game, a 6–2 home win against Farnborough Town, Gordon scored twice and provided two assists. On 23 January 2015, his loan spell with Chelmsford City was extended by a month. Gordon then ended his loan spell with the club the following month.

On 26 March 2015, Gordon joined Nuneaton Town on loan until 1 May 2015. Gordon made his Nuneaton Town soon after on 28 March 2015, making his first start, in a 2–1 loss against Halifax Town. In his fourth appearance for the club, he scored his first Nuneaton Town goal, in a 1–1 draw against Woking on 18 April 2015. Gordon made his last appearance in the last game of the season, in a 5–3 loss against Chester.

On 18 January 2016, Gordon joined League of Ireland side Sligo Rovers on loan until the end of August ahead of the 2016 League of Ireland season. Gordon made his Sligo Rovers debut in the opening game of the season against Shamrock Rovers, which saw them lose 2–0. Gordon then scored his first goal for the club on 7 May 2016, netting the final goal of the match as Sligo Rovers ran out 4–1 victors at home to Wexford Youths. After making ten appearances and scoring once, Gordon returned to West Ham in June 2016.

On 1 January 2017, Gordon joined League Two side Newport County on loan until the end of the 2016–17 season. He made his debut for Newport in the starting line-up in a 3–1 defeat to Stevenage in League Two on 7 January. Gordon scored his first goal for Newport on 4 February in a League Two 1–1 draw with Cheltenham Town.

Cheltenham Town
With mutual consent to leave West Ham still in contract, Gordon signed in September 2017 for Cheltenham Town. On 10 May 2018, it was announced that Gordon would leave Cheltenham at the end of his current deal in June 2018 during a long-term injury period which put Gordon out for the foreseeable.

Tamworth
Gordon joined Southern League Premier Division Central side Tamworth, initially as a trialist on a non-contract, in the hope that he could regain match fitness following on from a long injury lay off during his time at Cheltenham Town.

He played his first game in a Staffordshire FA Senior Cup tie away at Kidsgrove Athletic, which they were defeated 6–0, but following on from the departure of striker Michael Taylor, Gordon was in contention to make his league debut at hone to Bedworth United.

However Gordon's league debut for Tamworth came in the next home game, against St Neots Town on 9 February 2019, coming on as an 81st-minute substitute for Tyrell Waite in a 5–0 victory for the home side.

Gordon scored his first goal for Tamworth on 2 March 2019, scoring the fourth goal in a 4–1 home victory against Halesowen Town.

Banbury United
On 16 August 2019, Gordon was announced as signing for Southern League Premier Division Central side Banbury United.

Oxford City
After an impressive start to 2019–20, Gordon was announced as signing for National League South side Oxford City.

Tamworth
On 19 September 2020, Jaanai was announced as re-signing for Southern League Premier Division Central side Tamworth. Gordon made his second debut the same day as Tamworth drew 1–1 away at Peterborough Sports on the opening day of the season.

Stratford Town
In August 2021 Gordon signed for Stratford Town. He scored on his debut against Coalville Town on 14 August. On 16 October Gordon scored the equaliser in a 1-1 draw against Boston United in the club's FA Cup 4th Qualifying Round match. Three days later, he scored the opening two goals in the replay as part of a 3-2 victory which saw Stratford qualify for the first round proper of the FA Cup for the first time in their history.

Hereford
Gordon signed for National League North side Hereford on 16 November 2021 on a dual registration basis.

Brackley Town
On 22 February 2022, he signed for fellow National League North side Brackley Town after the club had made a seven-day approach for Gordon, even after Hereford offered him more money to stay.

Boston United
After a second-placed finish before being defeated in the play-offs, Gordon left Brackley at the end of the 2021–22 season to join league rivals Boston United. On 9 December 2022, Gordon rejoined former club Banbury United on loan until 7 March 2023.

Career statistics

Club

References

External links

1995 births
Living people
Footballers from Northampton
English footballers
Association football forwards
Luton Town F.C. players
Peterborough United F.C. players
West Ham United F.C. players
Chelmsford City F.C. players
Nuneaton Borough F.C. players
Sligo Rovers F.C. players
Newport County A.F.C. players
Cheltenham Town F.C. players
Tamworth F.C. players
Banbury United F.C. players
Oxford City F.C. players
Hereford F.C. players
Brackley Town F.C. players
Boston United F.C. players
Black British sportspeople
English Football League players
National League (English football) players
Expatriate association footballers in the Republic of Ireland
English expatriate footballers
Southern Football League players